Helen Martin (1909–2000) was an American actress.

Helen Martin is also the name of:

Helen Reimensnyder Martin (1868–1939), American author
Helen M. Martin (1889–1973), American geologist

See also
Helene Chung Martin, Australian journalist active 1968–present